The surname Tylecote is an English family name, believed to be of Norman origin. The name took the form Talcott, Talcoat and Tayllcote through the sixteenth, seventeenth and eighteenth centuries.

Notable people with the name include:

 Andrew Tylecote (born 1946), British economist
 Edward Ferdinando Sutton Tylecote (1849–1938), English cricketer
 Frank Edward Tylecote (1879–1965), British doctor
 Mabel Tylecote (1896–1987), British politician and educationist
 Ronald F. Tylecote (1916–1990), British archaeologist and metallurgist

English-language surnames